Mengmao is a subdistrict in Ruili, Yunnan, China. It is the political, economic and cultural center of Ruili.

Etymology
"Mengmao" means "foggy place" in Dai language.

Administrative division
As of 2016, the town is divided into seven villages and eight communities: 
 Youyi Community
 Luchuan Community
 Xing'an Community
 Munao Community
 Ruifeng Community
 Menglongsha Community
 Maoxiang Community
 Guomen Community
 Tuanjie
 Mengmao
 Jiegang
 Jiele
 Jiedong
 Mangling
 Mengli

History
Mengmao was designated as a town in 1934 by Ruili Shezhi Bureau. After the establishment of the Communist State in 1949, it came under the jurisdiction of the 1st District of Ruili County. In 1969, during the Cultural Revolution, it was renamed "Mengmao People's Commune" and then "Hongcheng People's Commune". After smashing the Gang of Four, the town reverted to its former name of "Mengmao". The Jiele Township, Yinhe Subdistrict and Ruihong Subdistrict were merged into Mengmao in January 2005. In October 2006, Tuanjie Village and Maoxiang Community of Ruili Border Economic Cooperation Zone were merged into Mengmao. Yunnan provincial government approve revoking Mengmao Town and establish Mengmao Subdistrict on 11 August 2021.

Geography
The local forest coverage is 50.48%.

The Shweli River flows through the town.

The Nongmo Lake is an oxbow lake is located in the town.

Economy
The local economy is primarily based upon agriculture and local industry. The main crops are rice, sugarcane, vegetables, medicinal materials, rubber, coffee and grapefruit.

Demographics

In 2016, the local population was 104,681, including 68,357 Han (65.3%), 28,055 Dai (26.8%) and 3,769 Jingpo (3.6%).

Tourist attractions
There are many natural and cultural landscapes in the town, the most famous of which are the Jiele Gold Pagoda, Nong'an Pagoda, Hansha Temple, Pinglu Townsite, Zhaduo Waterfall, and Nongmo Lake.

Transportation
Mengmao is the end of Longling–Ruili Expressway, China National Highway 320, and China National Highway 556.

References

Divisions of Ruili